Bhavna Gaur  is an Indian politician and is member of the Delhi Legislative Assembly. She is a member of the Aam Aadmi Party and represents Palam Assembly constituency in the Seventh Legislative Assembly of Delhi.

Early life and education
Bhavna Gaur completed her education in Delhi and in Rohtak. She holds Bachelor of Arts and Bachelor of Education degrees.

Political career
She was a MCD Councillor in 1997 from Madhu Vihar area on BJP ticket.

Bhavna Gaur is a member of the Aam Aadmi Party. She contested in 2013 Delhi Legislative Assembly election and received 26.79% votes and came on second position after four term BJP MLA Dharm Dev Solanki who won with a margin of 6.51% votes.

In the 2015 Delhi Legislative Assembly election she defeated Dharam Dev Solanki of BJP by a margin of 30,849 votes (20.90%). Her term as MLA in the Sixth Legislative Assembly of Delhi was her first term.

In the 2020 Delhi Legislative Assembly election she was re-elected.

Member of Legislative Assembly (2015-2020)
Between 2015-2020, she was an elected member of the 6th Delhi Assembly representing Palam Assembly constituency.

Member of Legislative Assembly (2020 - present)
Since 2020, she is an elected member of the 7th Delhi Assembly representing Palam Assembly constituency.

Committee assignments of Delhi Legislative Assembly
 Member (2022-2023), Public Accounts Committee 
 Member (2022-2023), Committee on Government Undertakings

Electoral performance

References 

Living people
People from New Delhi
Delhi MLAs 2015–2020
Delhi MLAs 2020–2025
Women members of the Delhi Legislative Assembly
1970 births
21st-century Indian women politicians
21st-century Indian politicians
Aam Aadmi Party MLAs from Delhi